The 61 Division is a division of the Sri Lanka Army. Established on 5 May 2008, the division is currently based in Boossa in the Southern Province. The division is a part of Security Forces Headquarters – West and has three brigades and six battalions. Major General D G Hewage Rsp has been commander of the division since January 2021.

Organisation
The division is currently organised as follows:
 611 Brigade
 8th Battalion, Sri Lanka Sinha Regiment
 8th Battalion, Sri Lanka Gemunu Watch
 612 Brigade
 12 Field Engineer Regiment, Sri Lanka Engineers 
 1 st Battalion, Sri Lanka Pioneer Corps
 613 Brigade
 3rd Battalion, Sri Lanka Gemunu Watch
 14th Battalion, Sri Lanka Gemunu Watch

References

2008 establishments in Sri Lanka
Military units and formations established in 2008
Organisations based in Northern Province, Sri Lanka
Sri Lanka Army divisions